Louise Fazenda (June 17, 1895 – April 17, 1962) was an American film actress, appearing chiefly in silent comedy films.

Early life
Fazenda was born in her maternal grandparents' house in Lafayette, Indiana, the daughter of merchandise broker Joseph A. Fazenda, who was born in Mexico, and Nelda T. Schilling Fazenda, a Chicago native. She was of Portuguese, French, and Italian descent on her father's side and of German descent on her mother's. 

The Fazenda family relocated to California, where Joseph Fazenda opened up a grocery store. Louise attended Los Angeles High School and St. Mary's Convent and kept busy with a number of after-school jobs, one of which was delivering groceries for the family business via a horse-drawn wagon.

Career

Fazenda was discovered by a scout employed by Mack Sennett in a high school comedy show. She made her first film in 1913. She was best known as a character actor in silent films, playing roles such as a fussy old maid and a blacksmith. She briefly left films during 1921 and 1922 to perform vaudeville. Her transition into talking pictures led to more serious roles. The Old Maid, in 1939, was her last of her nearly 300 movie appearances.

Marriage
In 1927, Fazenda married Hal B. Wallis, a producer at Warner Bros., and they remained married until her death. They had one son, Brent, who became a psychiatrist.

Death 
Fazenda died of a cerebral hemorrhage in Beverly Hills, California. Wallis was in Hawaii making a film and left immediately for home. She was interred at the Inglewood Park Cemetery in Inglewood, California. At her funeral, many stories were told of Fazenda's volunteer work, such as caring for children at UCLA Medical Center and taking in two children during World War II.

Recognition 
Fazenda has a star at 6801 Hollywood Boulevard in the Motion Pictures section of the Hollywood Walk of Fame.

She appears in the lyrics of "Out in the Street", a rock-ballad from 1975 by hard rock band UFO. "Your comic book impersonations, Louise Fazenda and Buster Keaton"

Selected filmography

 Poor Jake's Demise (1913, Short) as Servant
 Almost an Actress (1913, Short) as Susie
 Hogan's Romance Upset (1915, Short)
 Fatty's Tintype Tangle (1915, Short) as Edgar's Wife
 The Marble Heart (1916)
 Maid Mad (1916, Short)
 Maggie's First False Step (1917)
 Bullin' the Bullsheviki (1919)
 Salome vs. Shenandoah (1919)
 Down on the Farm (1920) as Louise - the Farmer's Daughter
 Married Life (1920) as Wife of Heckler at Theatre
 A Small Town Idol (1921) as Theatregoer
 Bright Eyes (1922, Short) as the Golfer
 The Beauty Shop (1922) as Cremo Panatella
 Bow Wow (1922) as the Country Girl
 Quincy Adams Sawyer (1922) as Mandy Skinner
 The Beautiful and Damned (1922) as Muriel
 The Fog (1923) as Millie Richards
 The Spider and the Rose (1923) as Dolores
 Main Street (1923) as Bea Sorenson
 Mary of the Movies (1923, cameo, uncredited)
 The Spoilers (1923) as Tilly Nelson
 Tea: With a Kick! (1923)
 The Gold Diggers (1923, lost) as Mabel Munroe
 The Wanters (1923) as Mary
 The Old Fool (1923) as Dolores Murphy
 The Dramatic Life of Abraham Lincoln (1924) as Sally - a Country Girl
 The Galloping Fish (1924) as Undine
 True as Steel (1924) as Miss Leeds
 Listen Lester (1924) as Arbutus Quilty
 Being Respectable (1924) as Deborah Carpenter
 This Woman (1924) as Rose
 The Lighthouse by the Sea (1924) as Flora Gale
 The Night Club (1925) as Carmen
 Cheaper To Marry (1925) as Flora
 The Price of Pleasure (1925) as Stella Kelly
 Déclassé (1925) as Mrs. Walton
 A Broadway Butterfly (1925) as Cookie Dale
 Grounds for Divorce (1925) as Marianne
 The Love Hour (1925) as Jenny Tibbs
 Compromise (1925) as Hilda
 Bobbed Hair (1925) as Sweetie
 Hogan's Alley (1925) as Dolly
 The Bat (1926) as Lizzie Allen
 Footloose Widows (1926) as Flo
 Miss Nobody (1926) as Mazie Raleigh
 The Passionate Quest (1926) as Madame Mathilde
 Tin Gods (1926)
 Millionaires (1926) as Reba, Esther's Sister
 The Old Soak (1926) as Annie
 The Lady of the Harem (1926) as Yasmin
 Ladies at Play (1926) as Aunt Katherine
 Finger Prints (1927) as Dora Traynor
 The Red Mill (1927) as Gretchen
 The Gay Old Bird (1927) as Sisseretta Simpkins
 Babe Comes Home (1927) as Laundry Girl
 Cradle Snatchers (1927) as Susan Martin
 Simple Sis (1927) as Sis
 A Sailor's Sweetheart (1927) as Cynthia Botts
 A Texas Steer (1927) as Mrs. Ma Brander
 Ham and Eggs at the Front (1927) as Cally Brown
 Tillie's Punctured Romance (1928) as Tillie, a Runaway
 Domestic Troubles (1928) as Lola
 Pay as You Enter (1928) as Mary Smith
 Vamping Venus (1928) as Maggie Cassidy / Circe
 Five and Ten Cent Annie (1928) as Annie
 Heart to Heart (1928) as Aunt Katie Boyd
 The Terror (1928) as Mrs. Elvery
 Noah's Ark (1928) as Hilda / Tavern Maid
 Outcast (1928) as Mable
 Riley the Cop (1928) as Lena Krausmeyer
 Taxi 13 (1928) (uncredited)
 Stark Mad (1929) as Mrs. Fleming
 The Desert Song (1929) as Susan
 House of Horror (1929) as Louise
 Hot Stuff (1929) as Aunt Kate
 On With the Show (1929) as Sarah
 Hard to Get (1929) as Ma Martin
 The Show of Shows (1929) as 'Recitations' Sketch
 The Broadway Hoofer (1929) as Jane
 No, No, Nanette (1930) as Sue Smith
 Wide Open (1930) as Agatha Hathaway
 Loose Ankles (1930) as Sarah Harper
 High Society Blues (1930) as Mrs. Granger
 Spring Is Here (1930) as Emily Braley
 Bride of the Regiment (1930) as Teresa - The Maid
 Rain or Shine (1930) as Frankie
 Leathernecking (1930) as Hortense
 Viennese Nights (1930) as Gretl Kruger
 Gun Smoke (1931) as Hampsey Dell
 Misbehaving Ladies (1931) as Aunt Kate Boyd
 Newly Rich (1931) as Maggie Tiffany
 The Mad Parade (1931) as Fanny Smithers
 The Cuban Love Song (1931) as Elvira
 Racing Youth (1932) as Daisy Joy
 Once in a Lifetime (1932) as Helen Hobart
 The Unwritten Law (1932) as Lulu Potts
 Hunting Trouble (1933, Short) as Walter's Wife
 Alice in Wonderland (1933) as White Queen
 Caravan (1934) as Governess Bessie Opitz
 Wonder Bar (1934) as Mrs. Pratt
 The Winning Ticket (1935) as Nora Tomasello
 The Casino Murder Case (1935) as Becky
 Broadway Gondolier (1935) as Mrs. Flaggenheim
 Bad Boy (1935) as Mrs. Harris - Landlady
 The Widow from Monte Carlo (1935) as Rose Torrent
 Colleen (1936) as Alicia Ames
 Doughnuts and Society (1936) as Kate Flannagan
 I Married a Doctor (1936) as Bea Sorenson
 Ready, Willing, and Able (1937) as Clara Heineman
 The Road Back (1937) as Angelina
 Ever Since Eve (1937) as Abbie Belldon
 Merry-Go-Round of 1938 (1937) as Mrs. Penelope Updike
 First Lady (1937) as Mrs. Lavinia Mae Creevey
 Swing Your Lady (1938) as Sadie
 Down on the Farm (1938) as Aunt Ida
 The Old Maid (1939) as Dora (final film role)

References

External links

List of literature on Louise Fazenda
Portrait of Fazenda

American stage actresses
American film actresses
American silent film actresses
Actresses from Indiana
People from Lafayette, Indiana
Vaudeville performers
1895 births
1962 deaths
Burials at Inglewood Park Cemetery
American people of Portuguese descent
20th-century American actresses